Herrington is an area in the south of Sunderland, England.

Herrington may also refer to:

Herrington (surname), a surname
Herrington Lake, an artificial lake in Kentucky, United States
Herrington Hill, a hill of the Biscoe Islands, Antarctica

See also
Herington, a surname